Agnia clara is a species of beetle in the family Cerambycidae. It was described by Newman in 1842. It is known from the Philippines. It feeds on Theobroma cacao.

References

Lamiini
Beetles described in 1842